Kosovo Basketball First League (Albanian: Liga e Parë e Kosovës në Basketboll) is the second-tier professional basketball league in Kosovo. It was founded in 2001 it is run by the Basketball Federation of Kosovo.

Rules

Competition format
The league, operated by the Basketball Federation of Kosovo, consists of Kosovo Basketball First League which have 10 teams. For the 2014–15 season, the top team in "Kosovo Basketball First League" will be promoted to Kosovo Basketball Superleague and second best will play in an Relegation Playoff with the second from the bottom of Kosovo Basketball Superleague. The teams positioned 9th, 10th, in Kosovo Basketball First League will be relegated to a lower league – Kosovo Basketball Second League.

Arena standards
Currently, clubs must have home arenas with capacity of minimum 1000 seats.

History
The first basketball league in Kosovo started in 2001.

Other competitions
 Kosovo Basketball Cup

2022/23 teams

External links
 Official website

Basketball leagues in Kosovo
Second level basketball leagues in Europe
Sports leagues established in 2001